Douglas Charles "Doug" Rees (born 1952) is an American biochemist, biophysicist, and structural biologist.

Rees graduated from Yale University with a bachelor's degree in 1974 and received a PhD in biophysics from Harvard University in 1980. In 1982 he went to the University of California, Los Angeles. In 1989, he became a professor of chemistry at Caltech. There he is Roscoe Gilkey Dickinson Professor and Dean of graduate studies. From 1997 onwards, he has been an investigator of the Howard Hughes Medical Institute.   He served as the editor or co-editor of the Annual Review of Biophysics and Biomolecular Structure (2004–2014).

He examines the structure and function of metal-containing proteins, especially nitrogenase in biological nitrogen fixation, and membrane proteins that carry out ATP-dependent transport through membranes (e.g. ABC transporters). To do this, his group uses X-ray crystallography. His interest in nitrogenase began in William Lipscomb's laboratory.

In 2015 he received the FA Cotton Medal, and in 2020 he was awarded the Gregori Aminoff Prize. He is a member of the American Academy of Arts and Sciences, National Academy of Sciences, and was a Sloan Research Fellow.

Writings (selected) 

 Edited with Daniel E. Atkinson, Steven G. Clarke, David S. Barkley: Dynamic models in biochemistry: a workbook of computer simulations using electronic spreadsheets, Benjamin Cummings 1987
 as editor: Membrane proteins, Amsterdam / Boston: Academic Press, 2003, 
 with JB Howard: Nitrogenase: a nucleotide-dependent molecular switch, Annual Review of Biochemistry, volume 63, 1994, pp. 235–264.
 with MH Stowell: Structure and stability of membrane proteins, Advances in Protein Chemistry, Volume 46, 1995, pp. 279–311
 with JB Howard: Structural Basis of Biological Nitrogen Fixation, Chemical Reviews, Volume 96, 1996, pp. 2965–2982
 with George Feher, et al.: Light-induced structural changes in photosynthetic reaction center: implications for mechanism of electron-proton transfer, Science, volume 276, 1997, pp. 812–816
 Great metalloclusters in enzymology, Annual Review of Biochemistry, Volume 71, 2002, pp. 221–246.
 with JB Howard: Nitrogenase: standing at the crossroads, Current Opinion in Chemical Biology, Volume 4, 2002, pp. 559–566
 with F. Akif Tezcan, Chad A. Haynes, Mika Y. Walton, Susana Andrade, Olvier Einsle, James B. Howard: Structural basis of biological nitrogen fixation, Phil. Trans. R. Soc. A, Volume 363, 2005, pp. 971–984
 with FA Tezcan, JT Kaiser, D. Mustafi, MY Walton, JB Howard: Nitrogenase Complexes: Multiple Docking Sites for a Nucleotide Switch Protein, Science, Volume 309, 2005, pp. 1377–1380
 with Chris Gandhi: Opening the molecular floodgates, Science, volume 321, 2008, pp. 1166–1167
 with NS Kadaba, et al.: The high-affinity E. coli methionine ABC transporter: structure and allosteric regulation, Science, volume 321, 2008, pp. 250–253
 with E. Johnson, O. Lewinson: ABC Transporters: The Power to Change, Nature Reviews Molecular Cell Biology, Volume 10, 2009, pp. 218–227
 with JB Howard, et al.: Ligand binding to the FeMo-cofactor: structures of CO-bound and reactivated nitrogenase, Science, volume 345, 2014, pp. 1620–1623

References

Living people
Structural biologists
California Institute of Technology faculty
1952 births
University of California, Los Angeles faculty
Yale College alumni
Harvard University alumni
Annual Reviews (publisher) editors